Nida Lighthouse (Lithuanian: Nidos švyturys) is located in Nida, on the Curonian Spit in between the Curonian Lagoon (to the east) and the Baltic Sea (to the west).

History
The original lighthouse in Nida was constructed in the 1860s and 1870s during the German Unification. Twenty-seven metres high and built of red brick, it had 200 steps, which have survived to this day. It was planned to be 51.4 metres high, on raised ground, and built by prisoners. It was first lit on October 24, 1874.

In 1944, at the end of the Second World War, German soldiers blasted the lighthouse, destroying it. It was rebuilt in 1945 and renovated in 1953. The current lighthouse is built of reinforced concrete with horizontal red and white stripes.

See also

 List of lighthouses in Lithuania

References

Lighthouses completed in 1945
Resort architecture in Lithuania
Lighthouses in Lithuania
Lighthouses completed in 1874
Neringa Municipality